Collix intrepida is a moth of the family Geometridae. It was described by Prout in 1932.

References

intrepida
Moths described in 1932
Moths of Borneo
Taxa named by Louis Beethoven Prout